Jefferson Gabriel Nascimento Brito (born 4 January 1999), commonly known as Fessin, is a Brazilian footballer who plays as a forward for Busan IPark, on loan from Corinthians.

Club career
Fessin was born in Campina Grande, Paraíba, and represented Sport Campina Grande and ABC as a youth. He made his senior debut with the latter's first team on 6 October 2017, starting in a 0–1 Série B away loss against CRB. He scored his first goal late in the month, netting the second of a 3–0 home win against Londrina.

On 14 April 2018, after impressing in the year's Campeonato Potiguar, Fessin moved to Corinthians for a fee of R$2 million for 80% of his economic rights. Assigned to the under-20s, he spent the most of the 2019 campaign recovering from a broken leg.

On 16 December 2019, Fessin was loaned to fellow Série A side Bahia for the season.

Career statistics

Honours
'ABC
Campeonato Potiguar: 2017, 2018

Bahia
Campeonato Baiano: 2020

References

External links
Bahia profile 

1999 births
Living people
People from Campina Grande
Brazilian footballers
Association football forwards
Campeonato Brasileiro Série A players
Campeonato Brasileiro Série B players
Campeonato Brasileiro Série C players
ABC Futebol Clube players
Sport Club Corinthians Paulista players
Esporte Clube Bahia players
Associação Atlética Ponte Preta players
Sportspeople from Paraíba